"Regresa a mí" (Spanish for Return to Me) is a song by Thalía, from her album Arrasando. It is her biggest hit to date in European countries like Czech Republic, Slovakia and Poland. As a result of its success, Arrasando was certified platinum in the Czech Republic the song reached number three.

On February 10, 2022, Thalía officially released the music video for the English version of the song, titled "Don't Close The Door."

Music video
The music video was directed by the Colombian director Simon Brand.

Official versions and remixes
 "Regresa a mí" (Album Version) – 4:27
 "Regresa a mí" (Radio Edit) – 3:52
 "Regresa a mí" (English Versión) – 4:28

Charts

References

External links
 Regresa a mí (Music Video)

Thalía songs
2000 singles
Spanish-language songs
Pop ballads
Music videos directed by Simon Brand
EMI Latin singles
2000 songs
Songs written by Thalía
Song recordings produced by Emilio Estefan